The history of releases of the Inform programming language for interactive fiction dates back to 1993. The Inform 6 compiler and Library have always been separately maintained and released.

The "N" series libraries are modified versions of the regular Inform 6 libraries with special support for Inform 7. The first modified version, 6/10N, was actually based on parts of 6/9 as well as 6/10. The goal is to eventually merge the "N" series into the main series, producing one library that can be used with both Inform 6 and Inform 7, compiling to both Z-code and Glulx.

Notes 

Interactive fiction
Text adventure game engines
History of computing in the United Kingdom
History of human–computer interaction
Software version histories